The second season of Topmodel aired from October to December 2008 on 2BE. It was presented by An Lemmens. The judging panel consisted of modeling agency Dominique Models head Marc Dochez, former model and head judge Ghislaine Nuytten, make-up artist Rudi Cremers, fashion and beauty journalist and editor-in-chief of Glam*it magazine Pascale Baelden and fashion journalist Els De Pauw. Model Ingrid Seynhaeve, the presenter of the previous season, also mentored the contestants.

The winner of the competition was 19-year-old Virginie Bleyaert from Bruges. Her prizes for winning were a €25,000 contract and an appearance on the January 2009 issue of Glam*it magazine.

Contestants
(ages stated are at start of contest)

Episodes

Summaries

Call-out order

 The contestant was eliminated outside of judging panel
 The contestant was eliminated
 The contestant was immune from elimination
 The contestant won the competition

Photo shoot guide
Episode 1 photo shoot: Bikini shots (casting)
Episode 2 photo shoot: Flemish ballerinas
Episode 3 photo shoot: Nude shots
Episode 4 photo shoot: Various brides
Episode 5 photo shoot: Sexy in car with Sean
Episode 6 photo shoot: Beauty in South Africa
Episode 7 photo shoot: Showmance
Episode 8 photo shoot: Tinkerbell in front of cars; underwater nymphs
Episode 9 photo shoot: Glam*It in Marrakesh
Episode 10 photo shoots: Vamp on horse; Glam*It covers

Judges
Marc Dochez
Ghislaine Nuytten (head judge)
Rudi Cremers
Pascale Baelden
Els De Pauw

References

External links 

Belgium
2008 Belgian television seasons